Wrestling at the 2019 European Youth Summer Olympic Festival was held at the Heydar Aliyev Arena, Baku, Azerbaijan from 21 to 23 July 2019.

Schedule

Medalists

Boys freestyle

 Rustam Dolaev from Russia originally won the silver medal, but was later disqualified for doping violations.

Boys Greco-Roman

Girls freestyle

Medal table

Participating nations
A total of 275 athletes from 35 nations competed in wrestling at the 2019 European Youth Summer Olympic Festival:

 (1)
 (8)
 (18)
 (16)
 (6)
 (5)
 (2)
 (6)
 (10)
 (10)
 (12)
 (14)
 (2)
 (7)
 (9)
 (2)
 (17)
 (2)
 (3)
 (11)
 (7)
 (1)
 (1)
 (7)
 (18)
 (2)
 (15)
 (18)
 (2)
 (1)
 (5)
 (3)
 (4)
 (18)
 (12)

References

External links

2019 European Youth Summer Olympic Festival
European Youth Summer Olympic Festival
2019 European Youth